Pimelea concreta is a species of flowering plant in the family Thymelaeaceae and is native to northern Australia and parts of Indonesia. It is an annual herb with narrowly egg-shaped leaves and head-like clusters of white or pink, tube-shaped flowers surrounded by egg-shaped green involucral bracts.

Description
Flowering occurs from January to June.

Taxonomy
Pimelea concreta was first formally described in 1865 by Ferdinand von Mueller in Fragmenta Phytographiae Australiae from specimens collected by John Septimus Roe at Camden Harbour. The specific epithet (concreta) means "grown together", referring to the fused involucral bracts.

Distribution and habitat
This pimelea grows in woodland between Camden Harbour in the Kimberley of Western Australia and in the Top End of the Northern Territory. It also occurs on the Lesser Sunda Islands.

Conservation status
Pimelea concreta is listed as "not threatened" by the Government of Western Australia Department of Biodiversity, Conservation and Attractions and as of "least concern" under the Northern Territory Territory Parks and Wildlife Conservation Act.

References

concreta
Rosids of Western Australia
Flora of the Northern Territory
Malvales of Australia
Taxa named by Ferdinand von Mueller
Plants described in 1865